The Benjamin Daniel House, located on Canaan Land Farm in Mercer County, Kentucky northeast of Harrodsburg, about  off U.S. Route 68, was listed on the National Register of Historic Places in 1983. The listing included four contributing buildings.

The house is a brick one-and-a-half-story three-bay hall-parlor plan house which was built around 1800.  Its brick on north and south walls is laid in Flemish bond.  Accompanying the house are a smokehouse and two sheds.

References

Houses on the National Register of Historic Places in Kentucky
Houses completed in 1800
Houses in Mercer County, Kentucky
National Register of Historic Places in Mercer County, Kentucky
Hall-parlor plan architecture in the United States
1800 establishments in Kentucky